Hanafin is a surname. Notable people with the surname include:

Des Hanafin (1930–2017), Irish politician
John Hanafin (born 1960), Irish politician
Mary Hanafin (born 1959), Irish politician
Will Hanafin, Irish journalist, television producer and radio personality